The Brandon Indian Residential School was a former school located in Brandon, Manitoba. It was a part of the former Canadian Indian residential school system.

History 

Five kilometres northwest of Brandon, Manitoba, the Brandon Indian Institute was established in 1895 by the Department of Indian Affairs. The school closed in 1972. From 1895 to 1925, the Mission Board of the Methodist Church initially managed the school, intended for children from north of Lake Winnipeg. The United Church of Canada ran the school 1925 to 1969, and the Missionary Oblates of Mary Immaculate from 1969 to 1972.

Mortality

Records of deaths at the school were spotty and inconsistent. The 1905 annual report of the Department of Indian Affairs’ annual report noted five deaths, and Methodist Church records, only three in that year. In the 77 years the school was open, only nine deaths there were registered with the Manitoba Vital Statistics Agency.

The Truth and Reconciliation Commission of Canada found that over the 120 years of the program, 3,200 children minimum died at residential schools—one in 50 students, comparable to the death rate of Canadian POWs in Nazi custody.

Burials

An investigation of cemeteries and unmarked graves at the Brandon school site began in 2012, a collaboration of the Sioux Valley Dakota Nation (SVDN) and researchers from Simon Fraser University, Brandon University and the University of Windsor, with the goal of identifying the children buried on the site. A statement by SVDN Chief Jennifer Bone said that the project had identified 104 potential graves in three cemeteries. Cemetery and burial records account for only 78. In addition to two previously known cemeteries, the project has found a possible third burial site. The project received funding to continue its work in April 2019, but work has been delayed due to the COVID-19 pandemic. One of the burial grounds is now an RV campground.

References

Residential schools in Manitoba
1895 establishments in Manitoba
1972 disestablishments in Manitoba
Buildings and structures in Brandon, Manitoba
Controversies in Canada
Defunct schools in Canada
June 2021 events in Canada
Education in Brandon, Manitoba
Educational institutions established in 1895
Educational institutions disestablished in 1972
Mass graves
Schools in Manitoba
2021 controversies
Roman Catholic schools in Manitoba
Missionary Oblates of Mary Immaculate
United Church of Canada